Carlos Nvomo Mangue (born 13 May 1983 in Bata) is an Equatoguinean football midfielder, who plays for Deportivo Mongomo in the First Division.

International career
His father is Equatoguinean and his mother is a Cameroonian making him eligible to represent either country at international level. Nvomo has chosen to represent his country of birth. He has been international with the Equatorial Guinea national football team, at least, in a World Cup 2010 Qualifying match against South Africa and in a friendly match against Mali.

References

External links
Carlos Nvomo Facebook's profile

1983 births
Living people
People from Bata, Equatorial Guinea
Equatoguinean people of Cameroonian descent
Equatoguinean footballers
Equatorial Guinea international footballers
Deportivo Mongomo players
Association football midfielders